John Barkham may refer to:
 John Barkham (antiquary) (–1642), English clergyman, antiquary and historian
 John Barkham (writer) (1908–1998), South African-born American book reviewer